Crossbar is a company based in Santa Clara, California.  Crossbar develops a class of non-volatile resistive random-access memory (RRAM) technology.
The company in 2013 announced its goal was a terabyte of storage on a single integrated circuit, compatible with standard CMOS semiconductor manufacturing processes.

History 
Crossbar was founded in 2010, by George Minassian, Hagop Nazarian, and Wei Lu. As part of the University of Michigan Tech Transfer program, in 2010, Crossbar licensed resistive RAM (RRAM) patents from the University of Michigan. Crossbar filed  patents relating to the development, commercialization and manufacturing of RRAM technology.

In August 2013, Crossbar emerged from stealth mode and announced the development of a memory array at a commercial semiconductor device fabrication facility. It was said to deliver faster write performance; lower power consumption and more endurance at half the die size, compared to NAND flash memory. Since it is CMOS-compatible, it can be fabricated without special equipment or materials.

Crossbar received $25 million in funding from Artiman Ventures, Kleiner Perkins Caufield and Byers, Northern Light Venture Capital and the Michigan Investment in New Technology Startups (MINTS) program in 2012.
Another funding round of about $35 million was announced in September 2015, with investors from China and Hong Kong.

Crossbar primarily markets to original equipment manufacturers (OEMs) and system on a chip (SOC) developers of consumer, enterprise, mobile, industrial and Internet of things products.

See also 
 3D XPoint

References

External links 
 

Computer memory companies
Semiconductor companies of the United States
Technology companies based in the San Francisco Bay Area
Computer companies established in 2010
Manufacturing companies established in 2010
2010 establishments in California
American companies established in 2010
Companies based in Santa Clara, California